Fort Kissimmee was a fort in Highlands County, Florida.

References

Former populated places in Florida
Former populated places in Highlands County, Florida